The North American Qualification Tournament for the 2012 Men's Olympic Volleyball Tournament was held in Long Beach, United States, from 7 to 12 May 2012.

Venue
 Walter Pyramid, Long Beach, United States

Pool standing procedure
 Number of matches won
 Match points
 Points ratio
 Sets ratio
 Result of the last match between the tied teams

Match won 3–0: 5 match points for the winner, 0 match points for the loser
Match won 3–1: 4 match points for the winner, 1 match point for the loser
Match won 3–2: 3 match points for the winner, 2 match points for the loser

Preliminary round
All times are Pacific Daylight Time (UTC−07:00).

Pool A

Pool B

Final round
All times are Pacific Daylight Time (UTC−07:00).

Quarterfinals

5th–8th semifinals

Semifinals

7th place match

5th place match

3rd place match

Final

Final standing
{| class="wikitable" style="text-align:center;"
|-
!width=40|Rank
!width=180|Team
|- bgcolor=#ccffcc
|1
|style="text-align:left;"|
|-
|2
|style="text-align:left;"|
|-
|3
|style="text-align:left;"|
|-
|4
|style="text-align:left;"|
|-
|5
|style="text-align:left;"|
|-
|6
|style="text-align:left;"|
|-
|7
|style="text-align:left;"|
|-
|8
|style="text-align:left;"|
|}

External links
Official website

Olympic Qualification Men North America
Volleyball qualification for the 2012 Summer Olympics